José Ricardo Vazquez (born 7 December 1940) is an Argentine footballer. He played in 11 matches for the Argentina national football team in 1963 and 1964. He was also part of Argentina's squad for the 1963 South American Championship.

References

External links
 

1940 births
Living people
Argentine footballers
Argentina international footballers
Association football defenders
Chacarita Juniors footballers
Racing Club de Avellaneda footballers
Club Atlético Atlanta footballers
People from San Martín, Buenos Aires
Sportspeople from Buenos Aires Province
Footballers at the 1959 Pan American Games
Pan American Games gold medalists for Argentina
Medalists at the 1959 Pan American Games
Pan American Games medalists in football